America is the debut studio album by America, released in 1971. It was initially released without "A Horse with No Name", which was released as a single in late 1971. When "A Horse with No Name" became a worldwide hit in early 1972, the album was re-released with that track.

The album went to No. 1 on the Billboard album chart in the United States and stayed there for five weeks. It produced two hit singles; "A Horse with No Name" spent three weeks at No. 1 on the Billboard singles chart in 1972 (it peaked at No. 3 on the Adult Contemporary chart), and "I Need You" hit No. 9 on the Billboard singles chart and No. 7 on the AC chart. Several other songs received radio airplay on FM stations playing album tracks, including "Sandman" (long-rumored to be about the United States Navy VQ-2 air squadron formerly based in Rota, Spain) and "Three Roses". The album was certified platinum by the RIAA for sales in excess of one million units in the U.S.

Reception

In his AllMusic review, music critic David Cleary called the band's debut album a "folk-pop classic" and concluded, "In spite of its flaws, this platter is very highly recommended."

Track listing

Personnel
Credits are per back cover of 1972 vinyl issue.

America
Dewey Bunnell – lead and backing vocals, 6-string acoustic guitar (except on "Here" and "Never Found the Time")
Gerry Beckley – bass (except on "Three Roses" and "A Horse with No Name"), 6 and 12-string acoustic guitars (except on "Sandman", "I Need You" and "Pigeon Song"), lead and backing vocals (except on "Pigeon Song"), electric guitar and chimes on "Clarice", piano on "I Need You" and "Clarice"
Dan Peek – 6 and 12-string acoustic guitars (except on "A Horse with No Name", "I Need You", "Clarice" and "Pigeon Song"), lead and backing vocals (except on "Pigeon Song"), electric guitar (on "Sandman", "Donkey Jaw" and "I Need You"), piano on "Never Found the Time", bass on "A Horse with No Name" and "Three Roses"
with:
Ray Cooper – percussion
Dave Atwood – drums on "Sandman", "Here", "I Need You" and "Donkey Jaw"
Kim Haworth – drums on "A Horse with No Name"
David Lindley – electric guitar on "Children", steel guitar on "Rainy Day"

Technical
Ian Samwell – producer
Jeff Dexter – executive producer
Ken Scott – engineering
Nigel Waymouth – cover photos and design
Flash Fox – logo and graphics

Charts

Certifications

References

America (band) albums
1971 debut albums
Warner Records albums
Albums produced by Ian Samwell
Albums recorded at Trident Studios
Albums recorded at Morgan Sound Studios